Fahad Mohammed Al-Thunayan (born 29 August 1986) is a Saudi footballer who plays as a goalkeeper .

External links

References

1986 births
Living people
Association football goalkeepers
Saudi Arabian footballers
Al Hilal SFC players
Al-Taawoun FC players
Al-Taqadom FC players
Saudi First Division League players
Saudi Professional League players